The 2007 British Columbia Scotties Tournament of Hearts, British Columbia's women's provincial curling championship, was held January 24–28 at the Kamloops Curling Club in Kamloops, British Columbia. The winning team of Kelley Law represented British Columbia at the 2007 Scotties Tournament of Hearts in Lethbridge, Alberta, finishing with a 5-6 record in round robin play.

Teams

Standings

Results

Draw 1
January 24, 12:30 PM PT

Draw 2
January 24, 7:30 PM PT

Draw 3
January 25, 12:30 PM PT

Draw 4
January 25, 7:30 PM PT

Draw 5
January 26, 12:30 PM PT

Draw 6
January 26, 7:30 PM PT

Draw 7
January 27, 9:30 AM PT

TieBreaker 1
January 27, 2:30 PM PT

TieBreaker 2
January 27, 7:30 PM PT

Playoffs

Semifinal
January 28, 9:30 AM PT

Final
January 28, 2:30 PM PT

References

British Columbia Scotties Tournament Of Hearts, 2007
Sport in Kamloops
Curling in British Columbia
2007 in Canadian curling